George Makris (August 29, 1920 – October 16, 2005) was an American football coach.  He served as the 18th head coach at Temple University in Philadelphia.  He held that position for ten seasons, from 1960 until 1969, compiling a record of was 45–44–4.  He came to Temple after coaching the Bolling Air Force Base team. He succeeded Peter P. Stevens who was winless in his last season.

Makris coached Bill Cosby during his tenure at Temple, a fact that is alluded to in Cosby's skit "Hofstra" on the 1965 comedy album Why Is There Air?

Makris played at the University of Wisconsin–Madison as a guard. He died in 2005 at his home in Medford Lakes, New Jersey.

Head coaching record

College

References

1920 births
2005 deaths
American football guards
Temple Owls football coaches
Wisconsin Badgers football players
Wisconsin Badgers boxers
People from Medford Lakes, New Jersey
People from Rhinelander, Wisconsin
Coaches of American football from Wisconsin
Players of American football from Wisconsin